Folkeparken may refer to:

Denmark
 Folkeparken, Græsted
 Folkeparken, Hjørring
 Folkeparken, Horsens
 Folkeparken, Roskilde

See also
 Folkets Park, Copenhagen
 People's Park (disambiguation)